The 2002 Asian PGA Tour, titled as the 2002 Davidoff Tour for sponsorship reasons, was the eighth season of the Asian PGA Tour, the main men's professional golf tour in Asia excluding Japan.

Schedule
The following table lists official events during the 2002 season.

Order of Merit
The Order of Merit was based on prize money won during the season, calculated in U.S. dollars.

Awards

Notes

References

Asian PGA Tour
Asian Tour